Laurent Jiménez-Balaguer (14 January 1928 – 16 April 2015) Born in L’Hospitalet del Llobregat, Barcelona (Catalonia), Spain. He lived and worked in Paris. During the 1950s, he was one of the most distinguished painters of Catalan art, known for creating a private language. He belonged to the Abstract Expressionism and European Informalism. These postmodern vanguardists have been characterized by their multiculturalism, manifested in their contrasting pictorial textures, and the need to invent a new mindset.

Jiménez-Balaguer's purpose was to establish a framework of knowledge of the human psyche based on Ferdinand de Saussure's language model, in order to show how painting is a universal medium for the understanding of the Self. He regarded the construct of the Self as indispensable, and its visualization as vital; the human inner is neither an impalpable, untouchable soul nor an invisible, immaterial ego.

His conception of creation and society involves him in a process of a permanent revolution, from which the subject must struggle for the construction of the Self.

His work asserts that the Self is a performative act. Jose María Moreno Galván in 1960 considered him one of the twenty most talented painters of Contemporary Catalan Art.Two fundamental archetypes structure his field: the Body-Memory and the Exterior-Interior.

Early years 

Early on, Jiménez-Balaguer paints androgynous figures that exude a metaphysical sentiment.

His portraits emphasize what is within, unmarked by gender or cultural identity. Like El Greco, one of his artistic references, he seeks the transcendental essence of being. In 1955, he abandons all description of the world in order to focus on the problem of transforming the invisible to visible. He considers that painting allows for true knowledge of oneself, with the projection of raw material.

Following the parameters of Western philosophy, he thinks that all expression is an expression of something; therefore, the sign refers to a reality that constructs the object at the same time as the meaning.According to this tradition, everything is related and has its corresponding channels: everything is connected and meaning is constructed by analogy.

His concept of Other Reality arises from here, as well as his work regarding boundaries and the concept of limit.

The real, understood symbolically, is found between the Interior and the Exterior, between Corporality and Memory. One of his most important contribution to Catalan Informalism and 21st century painting is referencing this 'Other Reality' as a linguistic-pictorial sign.During these formative years, surrounded by political turmoil, he actively participates in the recognition of a Catalan identity. He learns to write in his language, Catalan, which was prohibited in Francoist Spain.It is years of experimentation for the painter as he works on the hidden matter, that which one keeps inside one's psyche: the fragile and subjective. Jiménez-Balaguer believes: "That which is sensed is a reflection of the intelligible", and he does not cease searching for the fundamental concept of individuation and independence.

Catalan Lyrical Abstraction 

At the age of twenty, he goes to the mountains of the monastery in Montserrat and begins to paint with his friend, Josep Guinovart, experimenting a new freedom and liberating himself of the contingency of convention. He meets Cesáreo Rodríguez-Aguilera and his wife Mercedes de Prat, and a close friendship ensues.He publishes a manifesto, He Escuchado, whereby he defines his aspirations along the vein of Stanley Cavell: 'Claim is what a voice does when it founds within itself in order to establish a universal assertion.'

His sensibilities are along the lines of Merleau-Ponty regarding his defense of the body as the subject, and Wittgenstein: 'The human body is the best image of the human soul.'He exhibits in Ciclo Experimental d’Art Nou directed by Josep Maria de Sucre i de Grau and Angel Marsá and his paintings enrich the contemporary Catalan art scene. At the Galería Clan in Madrid, he receives the invaluable support of Manolo Millares, El Paso (grupo) and César Manrique, the latter becoming a good friend and inviting him to continue their contact. The goal is to impede the obstruction of expression and obtain total freedom of the Self. In 1956, the art critic Juan-Eduardo Cirlot includes him in the Art Informal movement.Catalan identity is in search of specificity, and is in opposition to the official art sanctioned by Francoist Spain. The painters of the 20th century, mainly Joan Miró, insist on the need for a new art.In 1957, in the European May Salons, intellectuals such as Antoni Tàpies and Laurent Jiménez-Balaguer, present their latest works. All the Informalist painters evince a critical vision against a world of oppression and exclusion, dominated by diverse imperialisms.

Informalism and Information 

In the 1970s, in dialogue with the poststructuralist period, he continues to explore the possibilities of a knowledge of the Self. From then on, his work heralds a new period based on the understanding of the problem of human expression and its inabilities, inhibitions, prohibitions, and negations; Jiménez-Balaguer's paintings are a projection of the visualization of the unknown Inner.In spite of the abstraction of the images, he finds no reason they would be mysterious, magical nor mute; instead, they should be able to communicate meaning. The utility of a sign, is its power to give universal information that allows giving the subject more power.

Although, Inform in Catalan language, is that which has no form, Jiménez-Balaguer chooses to investigate the second meaning of the word. As all words, 'inform' is not a univocal concept but a polysemous one. 'Inform' is also an exhaustive and organized exposition regarding a topic.Therefore, according to Jiménez-Balaguer, Informal is telling information that still has no form, and Informalism is the science of the formation of the meaning. Informalism becomes, from this perspective, the artistic current that visualizes the space where significance is built.

In Defense of Subjectivity 

His work demonstrates a deep respect for vulnerability. It is constructed as a critique against contemporary society that produces the destruction of subjectivity. During these years, Jiménez-Balaguer concerns himself with the power of painting as force.He thinks that the informalist image bears witness to a semiotic pre-symbolic memory.It is during this time that he frees himself from the destruction of the 1950s and the scratchings of postwar Informalism, in order to step into the 21st century.

As such, after the amputations, the fragmentation of the image, the details of the wound, the assimilation of negativity and violence exercised against the matter of the Self, there is the human psyche that is capable of reconstructing itself.Jiménez-Balaguer focuses his art on the transformation of violence into Form.

Constitution of a universal language of the Self 

During the 1960s, Jiménez-Balaguer and his wife María Teresa Andreu (Mery) relocate to Paris and establish themselves in the intellectual milieu. They have four children, Cristian, Virginie, Valérie and Eric. He meets the Parisian jeweler, Jean Vendome.In 1961, he is introduced to Antoni Clavé and Stephen Spender from Gallery Saint-Germain. From then on and for the next twenty years, he develops a language of signs able to communicate the universal language of the Self.As such, it is a deconstruction of the idea that a private language cannot be understood by another.

For Jiménez-Balaguer, the Inner has as a destiny: universal communication. In 1986, he meets Michel Tapié, the originator of the concept 'Art Autre' and he is introduced to Rodolphe Stadler.From 1988 onward, he introduces a series of objects of the world in order to express the inward. His paintings become an enunciation with branches, ropes, cloth, grids, and nails.

Painting as interface 

Jiménez-Balaguer's work gains the approbation and support of Pierre Restany and is introduced to Joan Hernández-Pijuan at the Galeria Calart Actual in Geneva.

From 1990, Laurent Jiménez-Balaguer devises the first system of signs for a universal language of the Inner. Each painting becomes the space for the visualization of the universal language of the Self from which the construction of the subject is confirmed.His work questions the classic attributes of the subject: time, acquired memory, and suffering. His works enquire on such elements.

In 2000, he begins his philosophical dialogues with Alexis Virginie Jimenez on Catalan Art and Informalism; together, they create the artistic movement known as New Informalism. The movement begins in the year 2000 in his studio in Chevry II, in Gif sur Yvettes.The theoretical base is related to the New Cultural studies. Alexis Virginie Jimenez's art videos, ‘Interventions’, are taped there.

Jiménez-Balaguer's work shares certain core values intrinsic to the field of Cultural studies and the theoretical struggle of intellectuals such as Julia Kristeva, Jacques Derrida, Gilles Deleuze, Jacques Lacan, Michel Foucault, Alexis Virginie Jimenez, Judith Butler.The artist questions what to do with the cardinal points of Western metaphysics and how to interpret a new vision of the human identity.

Artwork : Universal graphic lexicon 
The ropes: symbolize the ties that unite the invisible Inner of man to the universal Totality. 'The rope is an emblematic material of the road that brings the artist to the territory of Informalism's Art Autre.'

Blue branches: symbol of the wanderings of the soul and its realization in a unitarian form.

The knots: these are psycho-noetic strokes of subjective elaboration.

See also 
 Informalism
Western painting

Individual exhibitions 
2012
Cicle Invasions Subtils amb Laurent Jiménez-Balaguer, Fundació Espai Guinovart, Agramunt – CATALONIA – SPAIN
2012
L’Emergència del Signe, Museo Can Framis, Fundació Vila Casas, Barcelona – CATALONIA – SPAIN
2010
"El Cos d’una memòria", Galeria Art Vall, Andorra la Vella – ANDORRA
2010
"Le Nœud", Galerie Saint Cyr, Rouen – FRANCE
2007
"Cuerpo de una memoria", Galeria Calart Actual, Segovia – SPAIN
2006
"L'au-delà du miroir", Galerie Guislain-États d'Art, Paris – FRANCE
2003
"Œuvres de 1960 à 1962" et "Souvenirs enfouis", Rétrospective, Galerie Guislain-États d'Art, Paris – FRANCE
2002
"Traces d'une mémoire", Centre d'Études Catalanes, Paris – FRANCE
2000
"Exposition", Galerie Guislain-États d'Art, Paris – FRANCE
1999
"2000 ans de quoi ?", Galerie Lina Davidov, Paris – FRANCE
1999
"2000 ans de quoi ?", Grand Théâtre d’Angers, Angers – FRANCE
1998
"Dedans/Dehors", La Corderie Royale, Rochefort – FRANCE
1998
MPT Courdimanche, Les Ulis – FRANCE
1997
"Images d'une mémoire", Les Cordeliers, Châteauroux – FRANCE
1997
Galerie Lina Davidov, Paris – FRANCE
1996
Galerie Finartis, Zug – SWITZERLAND
1995
Galerie Calart, Genève – SWITZERLAND
1994
Galerie Rami, Zurich – SWITZERLAND
1994
Galerie Lina Davidov, Paris – FRANCE
1993
Galerie Adriana Schmidt, Cologne – GERMANY
1992
Galerie Lina Davidov, Paris – FRANCE
1992
Galerie Adriana Schmidt, Stuttgart – GERMANY
1991
Centre d'Art Contemporain, Corbeil-Essonnes – FRANCE
1991
Galerie Claude Samuel, Paris – FRANCE
1991
Galerie Rami, Zurich – SWITZERLAND
1990
Galerie Calart, Genève – SWITZERLAND
1989
Galerie Claude Samuel, Paris – FRANCE
1987
"Réalité autre", Galerie Claude Samuel, Paris – FRANCE
1985
Paris Art Center, Paris – FRANCE
1984
Grand Orient de France, Paris – FRANCE
1982
International Arts Gallery, Chicago – UNITED STATES
1981
Galerie Vienner, Paris – FRANCE
1980
Galerie Vienner, Paris – FRANCE
1980
Musée Napoléonien, Antibes-Golfe-Juan – FRANCE
1979
Galerie Vienner, Paris – FRANCE
1977
Réalisation de huit grandes créations murales pour le Centre Hospitalier de Creil, Creil – FRANCE
1969
Dayton's Gallery 12, Minneapolis – UNITED STATES
1963
Joachim Gallery, Chicago – UNITED STATES
1961
Galerie Saint-Germain, Paris – FRANCE
1961
Savage Gallery, London – UNITED KINGDOM
1961
Galerie Toulouse, Copenhagen – DENMARK
1959
Galerie J.C. de Chaudun, Paris – FRANCE
1959
Galerie Mistral, Brussels – BELGIUM
1959
Centre Culturel et Artistique d'Uccle, Brussels – BELGIUM
1957
Club Universitari de València, Valencia – SPAIN
1957
Galeria d'Art Jaimes, Barcelona – CATALONIA – SPAIN
1956
Galeria Clan, Madrid – SPAIN
1956
Galeria d'Art Quint, Palma de Mallorca – Balearic Islands – SPAIN
1955
"Ciclo Experimental d’Art Nou", Galeries Jardin, Barcelona – CATALONIA – SPAIN
1955
Casino de Ripoll, Ripoll – SPAIN
1955
Galeries Laietanes, Barcelona – CATALONIA – SPAIN
1955
Galeria Sur, Santander – SPAIN

Retrospectives 
 Fundació Vila Casas, Can Framis, Barcelona – Spain

Museums/Public collections 
 Museu de l’Hospitalet, Barcelona – Spain
 Museu de Montserrat, Barcelona – Spain
 Fundació Vila Casas, Barcelona – Spain
 MACBA, Museu d’Art Contemporani, Barcelona – Spain
 Fons d'Art de la Generalitat de Catalunya, Barcelona – Spain
 Museu de Ceràmicas, Manises – Spain
 Artecovi, Fundación, Madrid – Spain
 Musée de Chateauroux, France
 Musée municipal de Bourg-en-Bresse, France
 Musée d’Art et Histoire, Rochefort – France
 Grand Théâtre (Angers), France
 Centre d'art sacré contemporain de Lille, France

Bibliography 
 Roberta Bosco, "Recuperación de un olvidado", El Pais Barcelona 2012
 Montse Frisach, "Rescatat de l’oblit", El Punt/Avui, Barcelona 2012
 Natalia Farré, "Jiménez-Balaguer 55 años después", El Periodico, Barcelona 2012
 Toni Mata i Riu, "Força sìgnica", Regio 7, Barcelona 2012
 Albert Mercadé, "L’emergència del signe", Escrits Arts, Barcelona, Catalunya, 2012
 José Corredor Matheos, "El retorn del nostre Jiménez-Balaguer", Fundació Vila Casas, Barcelona 2012
 Joan Gil, "El paisatge de la memoria", Andorra 2010
 Tomás Paredes, "El arte sirve para ir mas alla de la muerte", Agora-El Punto, perfil L.Jiménez-Balaguer, Madrid 2007
 Tomás Paredes, "Jiménez-Balaguer, Cuerpo de una memoria", El Punto de las Artes, Madrid 2007
 Tomás Paredes, "La unión de lo telúrico y lo celestial", La Vanguardia, Barcelona, Madrid 2007
 Antonio Madrigal, "Desgarramiento necesario, pinturas de Jiménez-Balaguer", El Adelantado, Segovia, Spain 2007
 Lydia Harambourg, "L'au-delà du miroir", Le Magazine – de Musées en Galeries, Paris, France 2006
 Tomás Paredes, "El mas alla del espejo", El Punto de las Artes, Madrid 2006
 Tomás Paredes, "Jiménez-Balaguer, recuerdos escondidos", "El Punto de las Artes", Madrid 2003
 Lydia Harambourg, "Les signes telluriques de Laurent Jiménez-Balaguer", La Gazette Drouot, Paris, France
 Lydia Harambourg, "Jiménez-Balaguer", de Musées en Galeries, La Gazette Drouot, Paris 2002
 Tomás Paredes, "Jiménez-Balaguer, huellas de una memoria", El Punto de las Artes, Madrid, Spain
 Elisée Trenc, "Jiménez-Balaguer, l'élan vital", Paris, France
 Lydia Harambourg, "2000 ans de quoi ?", Grand Théâtre d'Angers, Claude Sabet Éditeur, Genève, 1999
 B. Guyomar, "Jiménez-Balaguer, cordes et âme", Courrier de l'Ouest, France
 Lydia Harambourg, La Gazette Drouot, Paris, France
 Michel Nuridsany, "Une ouverture", Les Cordeliers, Châteauroux, France 1997
 Kim Sang Ong-Van-Cung, "La figure de la création", Paris 1997
 Arthur et Yves Desclozeaux, "Au bout de la rue ... peintres et sculpteurs de Boulogne", Éditions Turbulences, 1992
 Chantal Cusin-Berche, "Le signe de l'absolu", France 1991
 Michel Giroud, "Le combat de la peinture, la peinture d'un combat", Centre d'Art Contemporain, Corbeil-Essonnes, France
 Pierre Restany/Gérard Xuriguera, "Le corps d'une mémoire", Herford, R.F.A, Drudk + Lithographie GmbH Éditeur, 1990
 Gérard Xuriguera, "Jiménez-Balaguer, œuvres des années 60", Genève, Claude Sabet Éditeur
 Catherine Francblin, Paris, France 1989
 Enté, alias Alexis Virginie Jimenez, "Réalité Autre", Paris, France 1987
 Claude Bouyeure, "Jiménez-Balaguer : Ligne après ligne", Magazine d’Art Cimaise, n° 176, France 1985
 Gérard Xuriguera, "La substance première", Paris, France
 Alain Macaire, Canal, n°1
 Ben Milard, París, Les Cahiers de la peinture, n° 181
 Claude Dorval, "Les peintures de Jiménez-Balaguer", Paris, Profils, 1984
 Yak Rivais, Paris, Les Cahiers de la peinture, n° 119
 Alain Macaire, "Une mémoire cosmique", Canal, n° 39
 Michel Arsene-Henry, Paris, Art Press, n° 48, 1981
 Claude Dorval, Paris, France
 Donatella Micault, "Un peintre, une œuvre : Jiménez-Balaguer", La Presse Française, 1980
 Claude Dorval, Art Press, n° 38
 Paule Gauthier, "Jiménez-Balaguer – Vers Un méta-matérialisme", Magazine d’Art Cimaise, n° 143, France, 1979
 Adam Saulnier, Paris
 G. Gassiot-Talabot, Magazine d’Art Cimaise, n° 53, 1961
 Stephen Spender, London
 Jasia Reicharat, Apollo, Modern Art in London, London
 M.F. Prieto, "Jiménez-Balaguer : l'art comme mystique"
 Robert Vrinat, Paris 1960
 Jamil Hamoudi, "Jiménez-Balaguer", Paris, Collection Arts et Lettres, Éditions Ishtar
 Maurice Gieure, Paris
 Jean Sylvain, Paris 1959
 Jean-Albert Cartier, Paris
 Denys Chevalier, Paris, Aujourd'hui, n° 26
 Alberto del Castillo, Diario de Barcelona, mars 1957
 Jorge del Castillo, Barcelona, Revista Fotogramas, n° 430
 Joan Fuster, "Peintura de Jiménez-Balaguer", Valencia
 José Maria de Martin, "La Jirafa", abril 1957
 Àngel Marsà, Correo catalán, febrero 1957
 Rafael Manzano, "La peinture pathétique de Jiménez-Balaguer" La Revista, n° 254, 1956
 Manuel Sánchez-Camargo, Palma de Mallorca, 1956
 Cesáreo Rodríguez-Aguilera, La Jirafa, Barcelona, Madrid 1956
 José de Castro Arines, "La pintura de Jiménez-Balaguer", Informaciones, Madrid 1956
 Juan Eduardo Cirlot, "Jiménez-Balaguer", monografía, Barcelona 1956
 Manuel Sánchez-Camargo, Revista, 1956, Manuel ARCE, "La peinture de Jiménez Balaguer", Alerta, Santander 1955
 Sebastià Gasch/Josep Maria de Sucre i de Grau, Barcelona
 Cesáreo Rodríguez-Aguilera, " Message du peintre ", Revista, febrero-marzo 1955
 Cesáreo Rodríguez-Aguilera, " Création et Communication" Santander 1955
 Español Vinas, "Jiménez-Balaguer et sa peinture", Barcelona, Imagenez y el Arte
 Sebastià Gasch, "Avec Jiménez-Balaguer", Destino, Barcelona 1954
 Àngel Marsà, "Quinze minutes devant les tableaux de Jiménez-Balaguer"

References

External links 

  Site Laurent Jiménez-balaguer
  Art moderne et contemporain
  Web oficial de Bonart

Official Laurent Jiménez-Balaguer Website

2015 deaths
1928 births
Art Informel and Tachisme painters
21st-century French painters
21st-century French male artists
20th-century French painters
20th-century French male artists
French male painters
Painters from Paris
Painters from Barcelona
Painters from Catalonia
Sculptors from Catalonia
20th-century French sculptors
French male sculptors